Bamikole Richard Ayi (born September 27, 1978) is a former American football linebacker who played two seasons in the National Football League with the New England Patriots and St. Louis Rams. Ayi played college football at the University of Massachusetts and attended Nashua High School in Nashua, New Hampshire. He was a member of the new England Patriots team that won Super Bowl XXXVI.

References

External links
Just Sports Stats
Fanbase profile

Living people
1978 births
American football linebackers
UMass Minutemen football players
New England Patriots players
St. Louis Rams players
Players of American football from Ann Arbor, Michigan